The Skipper 20 is an American trailerable, "character" sailboat that was designed as a daysailer and pocket cruiser and first built in 1978. The designer is not known.

Production
The design was built by Southern Sails in the United States, from 1978 until 1981, but it is now out of production.

Design
The Skipper 20 is a recreational keelboat, built predominantly of fiberglass, with wood trim and simulated lapstrake construction. It has a fractional sloop rig, canoe hull with a raked stem, a rounded transom, a transom-hung rudder controlled by a tiller and a fixed fin keel. It was produced in two versions, one with a standard cabin and the other with a cuddy cabin.

The boat is normally fitted with a small  well-mounted outboard motor for docking and maneuvering.

The design has sleeping accommodation for two people, with a double "V"-berth in the bow. The portable-type head is located under the "V"-berth.

Variants
Skipper 20
This cabin model displaces  and carries  of ballast.
Skipper 20 Cuddy
This model displaces  and carries  of ballast.

Operational history
In a 2010 review Steve Henkel wrote, "this is a character boat of a type attractive to people who think that a sailboat hull shaped like a lifeboat is safer than a hull with a normal transom, In reality, it isn't, at least in a vessel this small. Best features: Compared with her comp[etitor]s, the Skipper 20 has a larger cockpit, with a convenient outboard engine in a well under a hatch just ahead of the rudder, and her simulated lapstrake topsides give her a jaunty antique look. Worst features: Perhaps the designer (who is unidentified in the literature we've seen) expected all skippers to spend most of their time under power. That seems a likely possibility considering the boat's pitifully short mast and tiny sails—exacerbated by a main boom which is needlessly high on the mast. Moreover, the stubby keel is too shallow to keep the boat from side-slipping under sail, and for reasons we can't fathom, the rudder is much too small for effective steering while sailing ..."

See also
List of sailing boat types

References

External links
Photo of a Skipper 20
Skipper 20 video

Keelboats
1970s sailboat type designs
Sailing yachts 
Trailer sailers
Sailboat types built by Southern Sails